Javier Castelo Parada (born 26 October 1945) is a Mexican politician affiliated with the PAN. He served as Senator of the LX and LXI Legislatures of the Mexican Congress representing Sonora. He also served as federal deputy during the LIX Legislature and a local deputy in the LIII Legislature of the Congress of Sonora.

References

1945 births
Living people
Members of the Senate of the Republic (Mexico)
Members of the Chamber of Deputies (Mexico)
Members of the Congress of Sonora
National Action Party (Mexico) politicians
Monterrey Institute of Technology and Higher Education alumni
20th-century Mexican politicians
21st-century Mexican politicians
Politicians from Sonora
People from Ciudad Obregón